Ohio elected its members October 10, 1826.

See also 
 1826 Ohio's 10th congressional district special election
 1827 Ohio's 8th congressional district special election
 1826 and 1827 United States House of Representatives elections
 List of United States representatives from Ohio

Notes 

1826
Ohio
United States House of Representatives